Kumar Vikal (1935-1997) was a prominent poet of Hindi language. He belonged to Punjab, India. He was most popular during the 1970's to '90's, the period which coincides with rise and fall of Naxalite and militant movements in Punjab. His poetry expressed the problems of oppressed and marginalized sections of the society. Secular and humanitarian content of his poetry helped in building communal harmony during the period when the Punjab region was facing Hindu-Sikh communal tension during 1980-1990. His poetry reflect a tinge of Punjabiat also which is regarded by critics as similar to Krishna Sobti, another well known Hindi writer from Punjab.

Works
Ek Choti Si Ladai, (Hindi-एक छोटी सी लड़ाई)
Rang Khatre Mai Hain, (Hindi-रंग ख़तरे में हैं)
Nirupma Dutt Mai Bahut Udas Hoon, (Hindi- निरुपमा दत्त मैं बहुत उदास हूँ)

References

External links
kavitakosh.org
ph-d-thesis-comparative-analysis-of-paash-and-kumar-vikals

1935 births
1997 deaths
Hindi-language poets
Poets from Punjab, India